The Motorola RAZR i (XT890) is a smartphone designed by Motorola Mobility. It was officially announced on 18 September 2012 in London, UK.

The RAZR i is the first smartphone by Motorola to feature an Intel Atom "Medfield" processor/SOC of the x86/IA-32 architecture, running a x86 port of the Android operating system. It is also the first smartphone with a CPU clocked at 2.0 GHz in its stock configuration. Externally, it looks identical to its sibling Motorola RAZR M launched two weeks earlier in the US, with which it also shares many of its specs. The RAZR i is an almost identical edition except it has an Intel Atom Z2460 processor., which gives it more processing power and imaging power; although it lacks LTE support. Initially it was reported that it does not fully support many high-end apps and games designed for ARM processors until these apps or games are ported and recompiled for Intel compatibility. However, Intel developed a binary emulator called Houdini that is present on the RAZR i, to allow ARM code to run on x86 architecture. A test showed that the RAZR i was able to run most ARM Android apps thanks to the background emulation, but that a few apps would still not function.

A special China-only version of the smartphone, the RAZR i MT788 was announced in November, 2012.

The GPU in the RAZR i's Intel Atom Z2460 processor is a PowerVR SGX540, a faster-clocked version of the same GPU as in the Samsung Galaxy Nexus and many older smartphones such as the original Samsung Galaxy S. While the RAZR i's raw CPU processing power can be excellent for tasks such as web browsing, its GPU can be considerably slower than the RAZR M, which uses a Snapdragon S4 CPU featuring an Adreno 225 GPU.  This may be alleviated somewhat by the Atom Z2460 being capable of providing much greater memory bandwidth, which has traditionally been a severe performance-constraining factor in ARM-based chips.

Despite being the first product from a "multi-year, multi-device" partnership between Motorola and Intel, no other Intel-powered Motorola smartphone was ever released afterwards.

Specifications

Software 
Operating system: Android 4.4.2 KitKat

Chipset 
SoC: Intel Atom Z2460 Medfield
CPU Architecture: x86 (IA-32)
Processor: 32nm, 2000 MHz Saltwell with hyper threading (2 threads), single Penwell core, 568Kb total cache (MMX, SSE, SSE2, SSE3, SSSE3, EM64T, NX/XD, HT, BPT)
Memory: 1024 MB LPDDR2-800 RAM / 8192 MB ROM
Available user storage space: ~5 GB
Storage expansion: microSD, microSDHC up to 32 GB

Display 
Display size: 4.3 inches
Resolution: 540 x 960 pixels
Pixel density: 256 ppi
Technology: Super AMOLED Advanced
Colors: 16777216
Touchscreen: Capacitive, Multi-touch
Special Features: Light sensor, Proximity sensor, Scratch-resistant glass, splash resistant coating

Camera 
Rear camera: 8 megapixels
Front-facing camera: 0.3 megapixels VGA
Flash: LED
Features: back-illuminated sensor (BSI), auto focus, burst mode, digital zoom, geo tagging, high-dynamic-range mode (HDR)
Camcorder: 1920x1080 (1080p HD) (30 fps)
Features: video calling

Compatible networks 
GSM: 850, 900, 1800, 1900 MHz
UMTS:850, 900, 1900, 2100 MHz

Connectivity and communication 

Data: DC-HSDPA, 42 Mbit/s; HSDPA, 21 Mbit/s; HSUPA, 5.76 Mbit/s/s, UMTS, EDGE, GPRS
Positioning: GPS, A-GPS
Communication: Wi-Fi, NFC, Bluetooth

Battery 
Capacity: 2000 mAh

See also 

Motorola RAZR M

References 

Motorola mobile phones
Android (operating system) devices
Discontinued smartphones